The Banking Company of West Africa (CBAO) (French: Compagnie bancaire de l'Afrique occidentale) is a Dakar, Senegal based private bank.

History

The CBAO traces its history back to the 1853 French Imperial Bank of Senegal, through the 1901-1962 Bank of West Africa (BAO), to the Banque Internationale pour l'Afrique Occidentale and its restructuring from a Senegalese government investment bank to an internationally owned retail bank.

Renaming and Reorganization

The CBAO is the result of a 1993 renaming and reorganisation of the International Bank for West Africa (BIAO), formed from the Côte d'Ivoire and Senegal, Niger, and several other branches of the pre-independence sections of the French colonial Bank of West Africa (BAO). Some sections in Central Africa became the Banque internationale pour la Centrafrique (BICA).  The Senegalese section split from the other BIAO banks and was partially privatised in 1965, thereafter owned by the Senegalese Government and the United States Citibank company.  In 1989, the BIAO Senegalese sections were liquidated into several private institutions, with a majority share of the largest going to the Senegalese MIMRAN Group. 1991 to 1997 marked a general collapse of the BIAO banks across West Africa: Méridien BIAO SA and Méridien international Bank limited (MIBL) of the Bahamas consolidated banks as Méridien BIAO Burkina, Méridien BIAO Niger (later BIA-Niger), Méridien BIAO Gabon, Méridien BIAO Cameroon, Méridien BIAO Chad, and Méridien BIAO Togo. The Ivorian section survived and retained the name BIAO Côte d'Ivoire, and was itself later privatised.

Recent Situation

In 2007, the Moroccan Attijariwafa bank bought a majority stake of the CBAO, and in 2008 joined it with the majority Attijariwafa owned Attijari Bank Senegal. The CBAO operates as a private retail and commercial bank entirely within Senegal.

As of December 2007, the CBAO had a capitalisation of 11 billion, 450 million CFA Francs. Attijariwafa bank owned 79.15%, 9% was retained by the government of Senegal, and 12% was held by other private investors.

References
Notes

Sources
Concentration Du Marche Bancaire : Attijariwafa arrive en force.  Amadou FALL, Le Soleil (Dakar).  22 December 2008.
AfDevInfo: CBAO

External links
CBAO.sn: Official site.

Banks of Senegal